Myriophyllum mattogrossense is native to the wetlands of South America. It is commonly used as an aquarium plant, but is in fact a mostly aquatic herb that can grow to 60 cm in length. In nature, it is found almost exclusively in marshes, ephemeral ponds, streams, or on banks of mud.

References

mattogrossense
Plants described in 1915